Socratic means related to Socrates; it may refer to:
Socratic dialogue
Socratic method
Socratic problem
Socratic questioning

See also
Socratic (band)
Socratic (Google)